Taleqan (also Romanized as Ţāleqān) is a village in Qaleh Rural District, in the Central District of Manujan County, Kerman Province, Iran. At the 2006 census, its population was 849, in 180 families.

References 

Populated places in Manujan County